Sabzuiyeh or Sabzuyeh may refer to:
 Sabzuiyeh, Darab (سبزويه - Sabzūīyeh), Fars Province
 Sabzuyeh, Neyriz (سبزويه - Sabzūyeh), Fars Province
 Sabzuiyeh, Kerman (سبزوئيه - Sabzū’īyeh)